The Embassy of North Macedonia in Washington, D.C., also known as the Moses House, is the diplomatic mission of North Macedonia to the United States.

The embassy is located at 2129 Wyoming Avenue Northwest, in the Kalorama neighborhood of Washington, D.C. The current ambassador of North Macedonia to the United States is vacant.

House

The Moses House was constructed in 1893 and is a mixture of Queen Anne and Neoclassical architecture. The house was designed by Thomas Franklin Schneider, architect of the Cairo Apartment Building on Q Street NW, and is the oldest standing building in the Kalorama neighborhood. The building was owned by businessman W.H. Moses until it was sold and converted into the Embassy of France in the 1940s. When the French diplomatic mission moved to a new location in 1984, the house sat empty for 20 years until it was purchased by the government of North Macedonia. Moses House was renovated and opened as the Embassy of North Macedonia on October 26, 2005.

Popular culture
The embassy is used in the story Crossings by Danielle Steel, where the French ambassador to the United States Armand DeVilliers resides and is preparing to go back to France with his American-born wife Liane DeVilliers in June 1939.

See also

 Foreign relations of North Macedonia
 List of diplomatic missions in Washington, D.C.
 List of diplomatic missions of North Macedonia
 List of ambassadors of North Macedonia to the United States
 North Macedonia–United States relations

References

External links
 
 

North Macedonia
Washington, D.C.
Historic district contributing properties in Washington, D.C.
Houses completed in 1893
Neoclassical architecture in Washington, D.C.
Queen Anne architecture in Washington, D.C.
North Macedonia–United States relations
Sheridan-Kalorama Historic District